Haycroft may refer to:

Places 

 Haycroft, Cheshire
 Haycroft, Ontario

People

As a surname 
 Gloria Haycroft, 1960 Australian national netball captain
 Sarah Haycroft, English field hockey player

As a given name 
 Haycroft Stirling, English cricketer